White House Inn is a historic inn and tavern located in Peters Township, Franklin County, Pennsylvania, United States. The "L"-shaped building consists of two parts: a two-story, five-bay stuccoed stone section built between 1804 and 1807, and a 1 1/2-story rear stone section dated to the fourth quarter of the 18th century.  Its architecture is representative of a transitional Georgian / Federal style.

It was listed on the National Register of Historic Places in 1986.

References 

Commercial buildings completed in 1807
Buildings and structures in Franklin County, Pennsylvania
Defunct hotels in Pennsylvania
Hotel buildings on the National Register of Historic Places in Pennsylvania
U.S. Route 30
National Register of Historic Places in Franklin County, Pennsylvania